The Northern Mariana Islands the Commonwealth of the Northern Mariana Islands. CNMI is an insular area and commonwealth of the United States consisting of 14 islands in the northwestern Pacific Ocean.

Lakes and ponds

Lake Susupe Saipan
lake stage Saipan
Laguna Sanhalom (Inner Lake) Pagan (island)
Laguna Sanhiyon (also Laguna Lake) Pagan (island)
Lake Hagoi Tinian

References

Lakes of the Northern Mariana Islands
Northern Mariana Islands
lakes
Northern Mariana Islands